Ordric was a monk at Abingdon who was elected Abbot of Abingdon in 1052 AD and died in 1066.

References 
 Kelly, S. E. 2000. Charters of Abingdon, part 1. Anglo-Saxon Charters 7.

External links 
 

Abbots of Abingdon
1066 deaths
Year of birth unknown
11th-century English people